Indian Springs is an unincorporated community in Los Angeles County, California, United States.

References

Unincorporated communities in Los Angeles County, California
Unincorporated communities in California